Thaimara Solsiree Rivas Barrios (born July 23, 1982) is a female heptathlete from Venezuela. She set her personal best score (5622 points) on June 21, 2003 at the South American Championships in Barquisimeto.

Personal bests
Heptathlon: 5622 pts –  Barquisimeto, 21 June 2003

Achievements

External links

1982 births
Living people
Venezuelan heptathletes
Athletes (track and field) at the 2003 Pan American Games
Athletes (track and field) at the 2011 Pan American Games
Pan American Games competitors for Venezuela
20th-century Venezuelan women
21st-century Venezuelan women